Daniel Carleton Gajdusek (September 9, 1923 – December 12, 2008) was an American physician and medical researcher who was the co-recipient (with Baruch S. Blumberg) of the Nobel Prize in Physiology or Medicine in 1976 for work on the transmissibility of kuru, implying the existence of an infectious agent, which he named an 'unconventional virus'.

In 1996, Gajdusek was charged with child molestation and, after being convicted, spent 12 months in prison before entering a self-imposed exile in Europe, where he died a decade later. His papers are held at the National Library of Medicine in Bethesda, Maryland. and at the American Philosophical Society in Philadelphia, Pennsylvania.

Early life and education
Gajdusek's father, Karol Gajdusek, was a butcher, an ethnic Slovak from Büdöskő, Kingdom of Hungary (now Smrdáky, Slovakia). His maternal grandparents, ethnic Hungarians of the Calvinist faith, emigrated from Debrecen, Hungary. Gajdusek was born in Yonkers, New York, and graduated in 1943 from the University of Rochester, where he studied physics, biology, chemistry, and mathematics. He obtained an M.D. from Harvard University in 1946 and performed postdoctoral research at Columbia University, the California Institute of Technology, and Harvard. In 1951, Gajdusek was drafted into the U.S. Army and assigned as a research virologist at the Walter Reed Army Medical Service Graduate School. In 1954, after his military discharge, he went to work as a visiting investigator at the Walter and Eliza Hall Institute of Medical Research in Melbourne, Australia. There, he began the work that culminated in the Nobel prize. From 1970 to 1996, Gajdusek was the chief of the Laboratory of Central Nervous System Studies at NINDS at the National Institutes of Health (NIH). He was elected as a member of the American Philosophical Society in 1978.

Kuru research
Gajdusek's best-known work focused on kuru. This disease was rampant among the South Fore people of New Guinea in the 1950s and 1960s. Gajdusek connected the spread of the disease to the practice of funerary cannibalism by the South Fore. With elimination of cannibalism, kuru disappeared among the South Fore within a generation.

Gajdusek was introduced to the problem of kuru by Vincent Zigas, a district medical officer in the Fore Tribe region of New Guinea. Gajdusek provided the first medical description of this unique neurological disorder, which was miscast in the popular press as the "laughing sickness" because some patients displayed risus sardonicus as a symptom. He lived among the Fore, studied their language and culture, and performed autopsies on kuru victims.

Gajdusek concluded that kuru was transmitted by the ritualistic consumption of the brains of deceased relatives, which was practiced by the Fore. He then proved this hypothesis by successfully transmitting the disease to primates and demonstrating that it had an unusually long incubation period of several years. He did this by drilling holes into chimps' heads and placing pureed brain matter into the cerebellum.  These animals then developed symptoms of kuru. This was the first demonstration of the infectious spread of a noninflammatory degenerative disease in humans.

Kuru was shown to have remarkable similarity to scrapie, a disease of sheep and goats caused by an unconventional infectious agent. Subsequently, additional human agents belonging to the same group were discovered. They include sporadic, familial, and variant Creutzfeldt–Jakob disease. Gajdusek recognized that diseases like Kuru and Creutzfeldt–Jakob disease were caused by a new infectious agent that had not yet been identified. Further research on the scrapie agent by Stanley Prusiner and others led to the identification of endogenous proteins called prions as the cause of these diseases.

"Unconventional viruses"
In his 1977 paper "Unconventional Viruses and the Origin and Disappearance of Kuru," Gajdusek postulated that the cause of kuru, scrapie and  Creutzfeldt–Jakob disease were caused by what he termed an unconventional virus. In comparison to normal viruses, unconventional viruses had a long incubation period and did not cause an immune response in the host. Although Gajdusek noted that there were no demonstrable nucleic acids in unconventional viruses, he did not rule out the possibility that unconventional viruses contained RNA at a low level, despite their radiation resistance.

These infectious agents were later discovered to be misfolded proteins, or prions.

Child molestation allegations and convictions
In the course of his research trips in the South Pacific, Gajdusek had brought 56 mostly male children back to live with him in the United States and provided them with the opportunity to receive high school and college education. One of these boys, now a grown man, later accused Gajdusek of molesting him as a child.

Gajdusek was charged with child molestation in April 1996, based on incriminating entries in published journals, his personal diary, and statements from a victim. In journals published and distributed by the NIH, Gajdusek wrote about sex between men and boys in New Guinea, Micronesia, and other Polynesian islands, and about his own sexual experiences with boys during his research trips.

Gajdusek pleaded guilty in 1997 and, under a plea bargain, was sentenced to 12 months in jail. After his release in 1998, he was permitted to serve his five-year unsupervised probation in Europe. He never returned to the United States and lived in Amsterdam, spending winters in Tromsø, Norway, where the polar night around the winter solstice helped him to do more work.

Gajdusek's treatment was denounced in October 1996 as anti-elitist and unduly harsh by controversial former Edinburgh University psychologist Chris Brand.

The documentary The Genius and the Boys by Bosse Lindquist, first shown on BBC Four on June 1, 2009, notes that "seven men testified in confidentiality about Gajdusek having had sex with them when they were boys", that four said "the sex was untroubling", while for three of them "the sex was a shaming, abusive, and a violation". One of these boys, the son of a friend and now an adult, appears in the film. Furthermore, Gajdusek openly admits to molesting boys and his approval of incest. The film tries to analyse Gajdusek's sexual behaviour, and also to understand his motivations for science, exploration, and life.

Death and legacy
Gajdusek died December 12, 2008, in Tromsø, Norway, at the age of 85. He was working and visiting colleagues in Tromsø at the time of his death.

Hanya Yanagihara's 2013 novel, The People in the Trees, is based on Gajdusek's life, research, and child molestation conviction. The novel centers on a character named A. Norton Perina, inspired by Gajdusek, who researches the life-extending properties of sacred turtle meat in Micronesia.

Works

Books
Acute Infectious Hemorrhagic Fevers and Mycotoxicosis in the Union of Soviet Socialist Republics (1953), Washington, DC: Walter Reed Army Medical Center.

Articles and monographs

Daniel C. Gajdusek was a prolific science author cum diarist, and published over 1,000 original papers, reviews and commentaries in scientific and medical journals. This is an incomplete list of some of the more cited ones.

 Gajdusek, Daniel Carleton. Unconventional viruses and the origin and disappearance of kuru. National Institutes of Health, 1977.

Further reading

External links 

 
  Current autobiography in Hungarian
 
D. Carleton Gajdusek Papers MSS 421. Special Collections & Archives, UC San Diego Library.
David M. Asher with Michel B. A. Oldstone, "D. Carleton Gajdusek", Biographical Memoirs of the National Academy of Sciences (2013)

References 

American expatriates in Norway
American Nobel laureates
American people convicted of child sexual abuse
American people of Hungarian descent
Columbia University faculty
Harvard Medical School alumni
University of Rochester alumni
Members of the United States National Academy of Sciences
Nobel laureates in Physiology or Medicine
People from Yonkers, New York
American people of Slovak descent
1923 births
2008 deaths
WEHI alumni
American expatriates in the Netherlands
American expatriates in France
Fellows of the Australian Academy of Science
United States Army Medical Corps officers
Members of the American Philosophical Society